Ernstia septentrionalis is a species of calcareous sponge from Norway.

References
World Register of Marine Species entry

Ernstia
Animals described in 2001
Fauna of Norway